Amuri–Ureia is a Cook Islands electoral division returning one member to the Cook Islands Parliament.  Its current representative is Toanui Isamaela, who has held the seat since 2010.

The electorate was created in 1981, when the Constitution Amendment (No. 9) Act 1980 adjusted electorate boundaries and split the electorate of Aitutaki into three. It originally consisted of the Tapere of Punoua, Anaunga, Punganui, Ureia, and Amuri on the island of Aitutaki, but has since been expanded to also include the Tapere of Taakarere, Vaitupa, and Vaipeka and the Motu of Akitua.

Members of Parliament for Amuri-Ureia
Unless otherwise stated, all MPs terms began and ended at general elections.

Election results

References

Aitutaki
Cook Islands electorates